I Love You Too is a 2001 Dutch drama film, based on a novel by Ronald Giphart.

The film received a Golden Film (75,000 visitors) in 2001, the first film to receive this award.

Plot
The film portrays the relationship between a young male student and a young woman with borderline personality disorder.

References

External links
 
 

2001 films
2000s Dutch-language films
2001 drama films
Dutch drama films